The women's 100 metre freestyle swimming competition at the 2002 Asian Games in Busan was held on 2 October 2002 at the Sajik Swimming Pool.

Schedule
All times are Korea Standard Time (UTC+09:00)

Records

Results
Legend
DNS — Did not start

Heats

Finals

Final B

Final A

References

2002 Asian Games Report, Pages 209–210
Results

Swimming at the 2002 Asian Games